Farma 7: All-Stars (English: The Farm 7) is the 7th season of the Slovak version of The Farm reality television show based on the Swedish television series of the same name. The show was filmed from February 2016 to April 2016 and premiered on February 26, 2016 on Markíza. For the first time, former players from past seasons will play again.

Format
Twelve contestants are chosen from the outside world. Each week one contestant is selected as Farmer of the Week. In the first week, the contestants chose the Farmer. Since week 2, the Farmer is chosen by the contestant evicted in the previous week.

Nomination process
The Farmer of the Week nominates two people (a man and a woman) as the Butlers. The others must decide which Butler is the first to go to the Battle. That person then chooses the second person (from the same sex) for the Battle and also the type of battle (a quiz, extrusion, endurance, sleight). The Battle winner must win two duels. The Battle loser is evicted from the game.

Guest appearance
During All-Stars season former winners Andrea Járová from Farma 1, Mário Drobný from Farma 3, Pavol Styk from Farma 4,Lenka Švaralová from Farma 5 and Tomáš Mayer from Farma 6 visited the farm.

Contestants 
Ages stated are at time of contest.

Nominations

The game

External links
http://farma.markiza.sk
 Farma Markíza 

The Farm (franchise)
2016 Slovak television seasons